China–South Sudan relations refers to the bilateral relations between the People's Republic of China and the Republic of South Sudan. China recognized South Sudan's independence on July 9, 2011.

China began friendly exchanges with Southern Sudan in 1970s when China sent medical teams and agricultural experts to provide assistance for the people there. In January 2005, China was one of the witnesses to the Comprehensive Peace Agreement signed between the north and the south of Sudan, which ended the 38-year civil war and announced the establishment of the autonomous government of South Sudan. Since then, China has started formal friendly exchanges with South Sudan and the bilateral cooperation in various fields has increased progressively.

In February 2007, Chinese President Hu Jintao made his first visit to Sudan and met in Khartoum with the First Vice President Salva Kiir Mayardit who was also President of the southern autonomous government. Then Kiir visited China twice in March 2005 and July 2007.

In September 2008, China opened the Consulate General in Juba. In February 2011, the Chinese government announced its recognition of the referendum results in Southern Sudan and China was one of the world's first countries to recognize the results. On July 9, 2011, when the Republic of South Sudan was established, China Housing and Urban-Rural Development Minister Jiang Weixin was invited as a special envoy of Hu to participate in the independence celebrations. On behalf of the Chinese government, Jiang signed the Joint Communique on the Establishment of Diplomatic Relations between the two countries with South Sudan's Foreign Minister Deng Alor Kol, meaning that on the founding day of South Sudan, China established official diplomatic relations with the new country and became one of the first countries to establish such a relation with it.

The government of South Sudan states in the Joint Communiqué that there is only one China in the world, the government of the People's Republic of China is the sole legitimate government representing China and Taiwan is an inalienable part of China. On the same day, Chinese Ambassador to South Sudan opened the embassy. From April 23 to 26 in 2012, South Sudan's President Kiir made a state visit to China at the invitation of Hu. During the visit, Hu held talks with Kiir, Other Chinese leaders, including Chairman of the Standing Committee of the National People's Congress Wu Bangguo, and Vice Premier, member of the Standing Committee of the Political bureau of the CPC Central Committee Li Keqiang met with Kiir respectively.

Non-interference

South Sudanese hip hop star Emmanuel Jal noted that China was seen positively by Sudanese and Africans due to its non interference policy, only doing business, saying- "The Chinese don't influence our politics, They don't comment on it, and what they want, they pay for -- sometimes double the amount. This tends to make all Africans happy -- from the dictators to the democrats, There isn't a party in Africa that doesn't like them. Even if you're a rebel movement and you say to them you can secure gold, the Chinese will simply say they want to buy it. The only foreign policy advice I heard from China was when they said to Sudan, 'Don't go back to war.' That's all they said. They didn't push anything else."

Human rights
In June 2020, South Sudan was one of 53 countries that backed the Hong Kong national security law at the United Nations.

Chinese development finance to South Sudan
Up to 2011, there were approximately five Chinese official development finance projects identified in South Sudan by various media reports. These projects range from assisting in constructing a hospital in Bentiu in 2011, to a grant of 200 million CNY for agriculture, education, health and water supply projects in South Sudan.

References

 
South Sudan
South Sudan
Bilateral relations of South Sudan